Dyspessa aurora is a moth in the family Cossidae. It was described by Yakovlev in 2008. It is found in Azerbaijan.

The length of the forewings is 9–11 mm. The forewings are light-brown with a contrasted white pattern. The hindwings are dark-brown.

References

Natural History Museum Lepidoptera generic names catalog

Moths described in 2008
Moths of Europe
Moths of Asia
Dyspessa